Radbourn is a surname. Notable people with the surname include:

Charles Radbourn (1854–1897), American baseball player
George Radbourn (1856–1904), American baseball player

See also
Radbourne (disambiguation)